Dennis Hackett (5 February 1929 – 23 August 2016) was a British magazine and newspaper editor whom many would say played significant roles on game-changing publications that reshaped the language of British journalism.

Hackett grew up in Sheffield, where he attended De La Salle College, then entered journalism with the Sheffield Telegraph in 1945. He spent 1947 to 1949 in national service with the Royal Navy, then resumed his career, joining the Daily Herald in 1954, then quickly moving to Illustrated, where he was Deputy Editor.  In 1958, he moved again to the Daily Express, then the Daily Mail, before becoming Art Editor on The Observer.

Joining the glossy magazine Queen as Deputy Editor in 1962, Hackett later served as Editor but in 1965 was poached by Nova, which soon became regarded as the sharpest consumer magazine of its day. Together with visionary art director Harri Peccinotti, he swiftly established Nova as an influential must-read for the movers and shakers of Swinging London, with men as well as the original target audience of women becoming devotees of its heady mixture of social issues and cutting-edge fashion and modern lifestyle features.

He stood down in 1969 to become a director of the International Publishing Corporation (IPC Newspapers) where the chief title was the Daily Mirror, then Britain’s biggest-selling red-top tabloid at 5 million copies daily. Hackett’s key task was to launch an irreverent midweek colour supplement, a challenge which was arguably of greater cultural significance than Nova. The Mirror was not only a serious-minded left-wing daily paper, but also in Cudlipp’s view, “the first quality popular paper”. Within that decade, only quality newspapers had launched free glossy colour supplements (Sunday Times, Sunday Telegraph, Observer), all of which had delivered boosts to their papers’ circulations.

Mirror Magazine published on Wednesdays and it reflected all of Hackett’s chutzpah and sense of zeitgeist, its October 1969 launch issue deciding on a future with the Butlins Redcoats for the 21-year-old Prince of Wales. Hackett hired a youthful editorial team led by Mike Molloy, who went on to edit the Mirror itself. Others who made their reputations here included Eve Pollard on fashion (later editor of the Sunday Mirror and Sunday Express), Jeffrey Bernard as low-life columnist, Delia Smith in her first writing role as cook, playwright Keith Waterhouse likewise writing his first columns, as well as screenwriter Arthur Hopcraft and the astrologer Patric Walker.

The magazine made waves for popular journalism, but closed one year after launch, not for lack of reader appeal, but because of faulty budgeting from the outset. At 5 million copies, this was the longest magazine run in the country using high-quality gravure presses and it had not been foreseen that those four-colour copper cylinders printing on the machines at Odhams Press in Watford would wear out halfway through the run. From the start, this doubled the weekly engraving bill in what was then the luxury printing process. Mirror Magazine closed in 1970 with a loss of £7million – an astonishing miscalculation by Hugh Cudlipp’s company.

Hackett's reputation was undimmed and he held numerous positions during the 1970s, including an associate editorship of the Daily Express, while writing books on the Bemrose Corporation and Ford Motor Company.

In the 1980s, Hackett became a television critic, working first at The Times, then for The Tablet. As a consultant, he organised the launch of You, the Mail on Sunday's colour supplement, then moved to Today, acting as Editor-in-Chief for a period in 1987. He had some success in the role, calling for tactical voting in the 1987 general election, to benefit the Social Democratic Party. However, he soon left to become editor of M, The Observer's colour supplement, then in the early 1990s was editor of Management Today.

Hackett died on 23 August 2016 at the age of 87. He is survived by his wife, Jacquie and their daughter; he also has a daughter and son from his marriage to Agnes, which ended in divorce.

References

1929 births
2016 deaths
British magazine editors
British newspaper editors
People educated at All Saints Catholic High School, Sheffield
English television critics